Paavam Ganesan is a 2021 Indian-Tamil language family drama series, starring Naveen Muralidhar and Neha Gowda and airing on Star Vijay and is also available on the digital platform Disney+ Hotstar before the telecast. It premiered on 4 January 2021 and ended on 8 October 2022.

Cast

Main 
 Naveen Muralidhar as Ganesan (2021–2022) 
 Sornam's eldest son. Chitra's younger brother. Priya, Nithya and Baskar's elder brother; He takes care of his family after his father's demise. Guna's childhood friend and husband and Yamuna's former lover.
 Neha Gowda as Gunavathy a.k.a. "Guna " (2021–2022)
 Eshwari's eldest daughter. Praveen and Srimathi's elder sister; Like Ganesan, she takes care of her family after her father's demise. Ganesan's considers her his best friend, but she has loved him one-sidedly for 15 years and married him.

Supporting 
 Anila Sreekumar as Sornam (2021–2022) 
 Ganesan, Chitra, Priya, Nithya and Baskar's mother
 Meenakshi Muruha as Eswari (2021–2022) 
 Guna, Praveen and Srimathi's mother
 Karuna Vilasini / Latha Rao as Chithra Rangarajan (2021–2022) 
 Sornam's eldest daughter, Ganesan's elder sister and Rangarajan's wife
 Yuvanraj Nethran as Rangarajan (2021–2022) 
 Chitra's husband, Sornam's eldest son-in-law and Ganesan's brother-in-law. He hates Ganesan's family for being poor.
 Shimona Maria James as Priya (2021–2022) 
 Sornam's middle daughter, Ganesan's first younger sister and Sudhish's wife
 Jay Srinivas as Sudheesh (2021–2022) 
 Priya's husband, Sornam's middle son-in-law and Ganesan's brother-in-law
 Samyuthaa / VJ Thara as Nithya (2021–2022) 
 Sornam's younger daughter, Ganesan's younger sister and Praveen's wife
 Anand Pandi as Baskar (2021–2022) 
 Sornam's younger son, Ganesan, Chitra, Priya younger brother, Praveen's enemy also Srimathi's love interest
 Rajesh Sekhar as Praveen (2021–2022) 
 Eshwari's son, Guna's younger brother and Baskar's enemy, Nithya's husband
 Pranika as Srimathi (2021–2022) 
 Eshwari's younger daughter, Guna and Praveen's younger sister also Baskar's love interest
 Santhana Lakshmi as Bhutan Sundari, Sudheesh Mother
 Dheeshanth as Lakshmi Narayanan, Nithya’s Friend
 Shayema Reyaldeen / Sivanya Priya as Yamuna Pandi
 Ganesan's cousin also his former lover, Pandi Wife
 Karthik Shiva as Pandi, Yamuna Husband (2021)
 Ashok as Gopal, Yamuna father, Sornam Brother
 Sai Lakshmi as Yamuna Mother
 Shyam as Gowtham, Ganesan and Guna Friend

References

External links
 Paavam Ganesan

Star Vijay original programming
2020s Tamil-language television series
2021 Tamil-language television series debuts
Tamil-language television shows
Television shows set in Tamil Nadu
2022 Tamil-language television series endings